A Terrestrial Atmospheric Lens (TAL) is a theoretical method of using the Earth as a large lens with a physical effect called atmospheric refraction.

The sun's image appears about a half degree above its real position during sunset due to Earth's atmospheric refraction.

In 1998, NASA astrophysicist Yu Wang from the Jet Propulsion Laboratory for the first time proposed to use the Earth as an atmospheric lens.

Wang suggests in his paper that:''If we could build a space telescope using the Earth's atmosphere as an objective lens the aperture of such space telescope would be the diameter of the earth. Telescope resolution could be enhanced by up to seven orders of magnitude and would enable detailed images of planets in far away stellar systems.'' If built, the terrestrial atmospheric lens would become the largest telescope ever built. Its high resolution would allow to directly image nearby Earth-like planets with a level of detail never seen before. As of September 2020, the main observation targets are Proxima b, located 4.2 light years away, Tau Ceti e, 12 light years away, and Teegarden b, also located 12 light years away. The three planets are currently considered to be potentially habitable.

However, using the Sun as a gravitational lens would produce images with higher resolution when imaging potentially habitable exoplanets.

See also 
 Gravitational lens
 Gravitational microlensing

References 

Atmospheric optical phenomena
Observational astronomy
Refraction